Thomas Dufferin "Duff" Pattullo (January 19, 1873 – March 30, 1956) was the 22nd premier of British Columbia from 1933 to 1941.

Early life and early political career
Born in Woodstock, Ontario, into a family of Scottish ancestry, Pattullo's early career was as a journalist with two newspapers in Ontario: the Woodstock Sentinel in the 1890s, and as editor of the Galt Reformer in 1896. He got a job as secretary to James Morrow Walsh, the commissioner of the Yukon, where he stayed until 1902. In 1908, he moved to Prince Rupert, British Columbia and soon became mayor. He was elected to the provincial legislature in the 1916 election, and was appointed minister of lands in the Liberal government. Following the defeat of the Liberals in the 1928 election, Pattullo became Liberal Party leader, and leader of the opposition.  In the 1933 election, with the Conservatives in disarray and not running any official candidates, Pattullo led the party back into government.

Premier of British Columbia

The Pattullo government, elected in the midst of the Great Depression, attempted to extend government services and relief to the unemployed. In the 1937 general election, his government was re-elected running on the slogan of "socialized capitalism". His government was unable to secure a majority in the 1941 election due, in part, to the rise of the Co-operative Commonwealth Federation. He was unwilling to form a coalition government with the Conservatives, so his Liberal Party removed him as leader and formed such a coalition despite his objections.

Pattullo was vocal in his opposition to extending franchise to minority groups in the Province, both during and after his tenure as premier. The concern raised was that if Chinese Canadians or Japanese Canadians fight on behalf of Canada in WWII, these Canadians would return home and demand equal rights of citizenship.

Later life

In the 1945 election, Pattullo lost his seat in the legislature and retired from politics.

He died in Victoria, British Columbia in 1956. He is interred and rested in the Royal Oak Burial Park in Victoria, British Columbia.

Honours

The Pattullo Bridge is named in his honour, as well as Prince Rupert's Pattullo Park, Mount Pattullo, the Pattullo Range in North Tweedsmuir Provincial Park, and the Pattullo Glaciers in that range. Calls have been made to rename the replacement Pattullo bridge in consideration of Pattullo's anti-Asian political decisions while Premier. The replacement bridge is due to be completed in 2024.

References

External sources
The Canadian Encyclopedia

Premiers of British Columbia
Leaders of the British Columbia Liberal Party
British Columbia Liberal Party MLAs
1873 births
1956 deaths
Canadian Presbyterians
Canadian newspaper editors
Canadian male journalists
People from Woodstock, Ontario
People from Prince Rupert, British Columbia
Mayors of places in British Columbia